John Spendluffe Technology College is a secondary school with academy status situated on Hanby Lane in the rural market town of Alford, Lincolnshire, England. It does not have a sixth form.

Admissions 
The current Headteacher is Mr Simon Curtis, who joined the school in September 2021 taking over from Ms Joyce Shorrock who retired in August 2021. There are 55 staff and 13 support staff. Currently there are 612 students on role, However it does not have a Sixth form.

It is a popular alternative for pupils living in the Alford area if they do not wish to attend or were not accepted into Queen Elizabeth's Grammar School, Alford

Academy and specialism 
In February 2003 the school was designated as a Technology College. Although the specialist schools programme has now ended the school still retains its Technology College status.

In 2005 the school was identified by the government as a foundation school, and in August 2011 the school converted to academy status.

Academic performance
The school gets reasonable results at GCSE, higher than Monks' Dyke Tennyson College, Louth and Cordeaux School, Louth.

Departments 
English Department

Humanities Department
 Geography
 History
 R.E.
ICT Department

Mathematics Department

Modern Foreign Languages Department
 Spanish

Expressive Arts 
 Art
 Drama
 Music
P.E. Department

SEN Department

Science Department

Technology
 Product Design
 Food
 Textiles
 Child Development 
This is from the jets website

Other schools in Alford 
 Alford Primary School 
 Queen Elizabeth's Grammar School, Alford

External links
John Spendluffe Technology College Website

Secondary schools in Lincolnshire
Academies in Lincolnshire
Alford, Lincolnshire